Anthene larydas, the spotted hairtail or common ciliate blue, is a butterfly in the family Lycaenidae. It is found in Senegal, the Gambia, Guinea-Bissau, Guinea, Burkina Faso, Liberia, Sierra Leone, Ivory Coast, Ghana, Nigeria, Cameroon, the Republic of the Congo, the Central African Republic, the Democratic Republic of the Congo, Uganda and western Kenya. The habitat consists of forests and Guinea savanna.

Adult males mud-puddle and are also attracted to sand soaked by urine as well as by human sweat.

The larvae feed on Acacia farnesiana, Afzelia species, Albizia gummifera, Albizia zygia, Dichrostachys glomerata and Hypericum species. They are associated with the ant species Pheidole aurivillii race kasaiensis, Camponotus akwapimensis var. poultoni and Crematogaster striatula var. horati.

References

Butterflies described in 1780
Anthene